Lal Patthar is a 1971 Indian Hindi-language drama film, produced by F. C. Mehra, and directed by Sushil Majumdar. The film is a remake of the Bengali film, Lal Pathar which released in 1964. The film stars Raaj Kumar, Hema Malini, Raakhee, Vinod Mehra, Ajit. The film is one of the rare films where lead actress Hema Malini played a negative role, being a jealous mistress of a zamindar who tries to frame his young wife as an adultress. Her performance received accolades. The music of the film was composed by Shankar–Jaikishan.

The film was shot on some minor outdoor locations and at Mehboob Studios, as well as at Natraj Studios Bombay.

Plot
Raja Gyan Shankar Rai (Raaj Kumar), also known as Kumar Bahadur, is a rich man who turns to drink after pursuing a young woman named Saudamani (Hema Malini). Calling her Madhuri, he invites the lower-class woman to his rich home but refuses to marry her. He later meets a much younger woman, Sumita (Raakhee) and organises a financial deal with her parents and marries her. The discovery that Sumita had a childhood sweetheart, Shekhar (Vinod Mehra), leads Saudamini and Kumar to plot the downfall of the pair.

Cast
 Raaj Kumar as Kumar Bahadur Gyan Shankar Rai
 Hema Malini as Saudamani / Madhuri
 Raakhee as Sumita
 Vinod Mehra as Shekhar
 Ajit as Raja Raghav Shankar Rai
 D. K. Sapru as Raja Ram Shankar Rai
 Asit Sen as Haricharan
 Paintal as Chhotu
 Dulari  as Mrs. Madhu Chakraborty
 Leela Mishra as Gokul's Mother
 Padma Khanna as Courtesan

Critical reception

Lal Patthar was one of the films featured in Avijit Ghosh's book, 40 Retakes: Bollywood Classics You May Have Missed.

Soundtrack

The film's music was given by Shankar–Jaikishan and lyrics were by Hasrat Jaipuri, Neeraj and Dev Kohli. The song "Geet Gata Hoon Main", written by Dev Kohli and sung by Kishore Kumar stood at number 18 on the Annual 1972 listing of Binaca Geetmala. Asha Bhosle received a Filmfare Award nomination for Best Female Playback Singer in 1973 for her rendition of "Sooni Sooni Saans Ki Sitar Par". Another memorable number in the film is the Ghazal, "Unke Khayal Aaye To", a composition based on Bageshwari / Gara ably sung by Mohammed Rafi. The song "Re Man Sur Mein Ga" by Manna Dey won the "Sur Singar" Award for the year 1971.

Notes

References

External links
 
 Lal Patthar at Eagle Films
 "Aa Aaja, Dikhaoon Tujhe Jannat" song and dance by Asha Bhosle

1971 films
1970s Hindi-language films
Films scored by Shankar–Jaikishan
Films set in country houses
Hindi remakes of Bengali films
Indian drama films